Urban Toman (born 21 October 1997) is a Slovenian volleyball player who plays for OK Budva and the Slovenian national team.

He participated at the 2017 Men's European Volleyball Championship.

References

1997 births
Living people
Sportspeople from Jesenice, Jesenice
Slovenian men's volleyball players
Slovenian expatriate sportspeople in Germany
Expatriate volleyball players in Germany
Slovenian expatriate sportspeople in Montenegro
Expatriate volleyball players in Montenegro